A lock and key is a pair of devices used to secure an object or location from unauthorized access.

Lock and Key or Lock & Key may also refer to:

Arts, entertainment, and media

Film
Taala Te Kunjee (Lock and Key), a 2017 Indian Punjabi-language film

Literature
Lock and Key (novel), a 2008 novel by Sarah Dessen
Lock and Key, a book series by Ridley Pearson

Music

Albums and EPs
Lock & Key (album), a 2014 album by Cruel Hand
Lock & Key, an EP by Wild Adriatic

Songs
"Lock and Key" (Klymaxx song)
"Lock and Key" (Rush song)
"Lock and Key", a song by Nina Sky
"Lock and Key", song by SNAFU from the album Situation Normal

Science
 Lock and key model, a model for the specificity of enzymes and other of biomolecules
 Memory protection, a computer memory protection technique

See also
 Lock (disambiguation) 
 Locke & Key (disambiguation)